Frank Wilbur Hertz (November 6, 1902 – July 20, 1963) was a player in the National Football League for the Milwaukee Badgers in 1926 as an end. He played at the collegiate level at Carroll University.

Biography
Hertz was born on November 6, 1902 in Marinette County, Wisconsin to Edward J. Hertz and Charlotta (Classen) Hertz. He died of a heart attack in Kaukauna, Wisconsin.

References

External links

1902 births
1963 deaths
American football ends
Carroll Pioneers football players
Milwaukee Badgers players
People from Marinette County, Wisconsin
Sportspeople from Waukesha, Wisconsin
Players of American football from Wisconsin